Kurt Boese (4 November 1929 – 21 September 2021) was a Canadian wrestler. He competed in the men's freestyle welterweight at the 1960 Summer Olympics.

References

External links
 

1929 births
2021 deaths
Canadian male sport wrestlers
Olympic wrestlers of Canada
Wrestlers at the 1960 Summer Olympics
Sportspeople from Bremen
German emigrants to Canada
Commonwealth Games medallists in wrestling
Commonwealth Games bronze medallists for Canada
Wrestlers at the 1962 British Empire and Commonwealth Games
Pan American Games medalists in wrestling
Pan American Games bronze medalists for Canada
Wrestlers at the 1963 Pan American Games
20th-century Canadian people
Medallists at the 1962 British Empire and Commonwealth Games